Ali Gohar is a Pakistani noted scholar and restorative justice expert and the founder and executive director of Just Peace Initiatives (formerly Just Peace International).

Early life and education
Ali Gohar was born in the village of "Kaala", district Swabi in Khyber Pakhtunkhwa, Pakistan. Ali Gohar has an MSc degree in international relations from Quaid-i-Azam University, Islamabad, Pakistan. He also holds a M.A. in conflict transformation from Eastern Mennonite University’s Center for Justice and Peacebuilding, in Harrisonburg, Virginia.

Career
For 13 years (until early 2001) Gohar worked as the Additional Commissioner Social Welfare Cell for Afghan refugees (a project of UNHCR) in northern Pakistan. His work covered 258 Afghan refugee camps with programs in HIV/AIDS awareness, peacebuilding, and community development. In 2001 Gohar was awarded a Fulbright scholarship to Eastern Mennonite University’s Center for Justice and Peacebuilding to complete his Master’s Degree. While at CJP Gohar worked closely with Restorative Justice pioneer Howard Zehr. They would later collaborate on a revision of The Little Book of Restorative Justice specifically targeted at the Pakistan-Afghanistan context.
Shortly after returning to Pakistan in 2003 Gohar founded Just Peace International (now Just Peace Initiatives), a non-profit aimed at working for peace and justice through conflict transformation practices. As part of this work he received a United States Institute of Peace (USIP) grant to explore the principles of Jirga as peacebuilding.
In 2006, Gohar began working as a campaign officer with Oxfam Great Britain to end honor killings and address violence against women in the Khyber Pakhtunkhwa (formerly known as the North-West Frontier Province) of Pakistan. In December of that year he left Oxfam to return to Just Peace Initiatives as executive director.

Notable work
In addition to his book Gohar has published a number of works on Restorative Justice practices and the Jirga practices. 
In June 2002 Gohar led a workshop in Peshawar, Pakistan titled, “Conflict transformation and peace building in Pakistan and Afghanistan in a 2002 world” highlighting efforts at community peace building and restorative justice.

In 2007, as part of his work with JPI he produced a 13 episode TV program for Pakistani TV on violent conflict titled, “Why it’s happened”. As part of this program he interviewed police, religious experts, jirga practitioners, and psychologists in order to understand the root causes of ethnic, tribal, and political conflicts.

Gohar has written several TV scripts for nationally broadcast programs aimed at combating drug use, preventing AIDS, reducing domestic violence, and honor killings.

In order to be successful, peace efforts at the grassroots require that local, indigenous mechanisms work in partnership with both the government and community. The participation of both is necessary in order to reach the underlying causes of the conflict, resolve it according to the local indigenous law, and make it on a par with standards of human rights as enshrined in the UN charter. Such local and indigenous mechanisms empower communities to take on the responsibility of conflict prevention, resolution and transformation, and move forward with the socio-economic development of their respective societies. - Ali Gohar

References

1956 births
Living people
Eastern Mennonite University alumni
Pakistani human rights activists
Nonviolence advocates
Place of birth missing (living people)
Quaid-i-Azam University alumni